Durdana Ansari OBE (born 1 March 1960) is a British entrepreneur, public speaker and activist for female empowerment. She is a former charity director, journalist, presenter and producer at the BBC World Service. She has interviewed politicians, Kashmir earthquake victims, Afghan refugees, Bollywood and Pakistani actors, artists, film directors and poets, and received an Order of the British Empire in 2012 for creating economic development program for Muslim women. She serves as a Brand Ambassador to Mirpur University of Science & Technology (MUST), the Swat Relief Initiative (SRI), and as a trustee for ‘Quest for Education’ (QFE).

Early life

Durdana Ansari was born in Bahawalpur, Pakistan, then grew up in Islamabad. She moved to London where she received her degree in media and journalism from Birkbeck University.

Career
Ansari was appointed as an Honorary Lieutenant Commander in the Royal Navy in 2018, she was promoted in 2019 to Honorary Commander; and once more in 2021 to Honorary Captain, becoming the first Muslim to reach the rank. She currently works as an adviser to the Royal Navy, holds community events nationwide for young individuals between the ages of 18 to 35 to meet naval officers and recruitment officials to learn about careers in the Royal Navy.  She also works with community leaders, local councillors, borough mayors, academics, teachers, and parents of young individuals who have shown an interest in naval careers. Durdana was also appointed as an Instructor based on her experience with British society and BAME communities.

Ansari established The Pearl Foundation to teach functional spoken English, reading, writing and computer skills to British-Muslim women, as well as integrate these women into wider society by building self-confidence and enhancing quality of life. Her work with The Pearl Education Foundation and the Ethnic Minorities Foundation (see below) led to the recruitment of approximately 9,000 students and 700 volunteers.

Ansari led a small program to teach Muslim women the importance of learning English and IT skills. Her work at the Ethnic Minorities Foundation was recognised by the Queen with the award of an Order of the British Empire.

Ansari spent 22 years producing, directing, and interviewing prominent personalities for the BBC World Service, the largest international broadcaster in the world, owned and operated by the BBC.

BBC programmes included the following:
 The World Today (radio programme) 
 Asian Network (Urdu) 
 Outlook 
 Meridian 
 English Teaching Programme 
 BBC Urdu Service

Ansari produced, directed and presented a bilingual Sunday Brunch Show for the global PTV channel.  Content included current affairs, arts, drama, TV, film and personalities of current interest.

Personal life

Durdana has four children, 2 boys and 2 girls.  Her first child, Amina Art Ansari, is an artist with paintings of the British royal family hanging in Windsor Castle.

Awards and honours

 2012 Order of the British Empire (OBE)
 2018 Honorary Commander Royal Navy

Charity
In addition to the foundations she has contributed to or started, she has participated in the Imran Khan Cancer Hospital, United Nations Development Programme (UNDP), Islamic Relief, and Helping Hands.

References

Living people
1960 births
BBC radio producers
BBC radio presenters
English radio personalities
British women radio presenters
Pakistani radio presenters
Pakistani women radio presenters
Officers of the Order of the British Empire
Pakistani emigrants to England
Women radio producers